Tomb TT196, located in the necropolis of El-Assasif in Thebes, Egypt, is the tomb of Padihorresnet, who was a chief steward of Amun during the Twenty-sixth Dynasty of Egypt. Padihorresnet's tomb is part of the TT192 tomb complex.

Padihorresnet was the son of the chief steward Ibi (tomb TT36) and Shepenernute.

See also
 List of Theban tombs

References

External links
 Projekt 2: TT 196 from the University of Muenster

Buildings and structures completed in the 13th century BC
Theban tombs